Hipparchus, the common Latinization of the Greek Hipparkhos, can mean:

 Hipparchus, the ancient Greek astronomer 
 Hipparchic cycle, an astronomical cycle he created
 Hipparchus (lunar crater), a lunar crater named in his honour
 Hipparchus (Martian crater), a crater on Mars named in his honour
 4000 Hipparchus, an asteroid named in his honour
 Hipparcos, an astrometry space mission named in his honour
 Hipparchus (cavalry officer), commander of one hipparchia
 Epihipparch, commander of two hipparchiai 
 Hipparchus (brother of Hippias), brother of Athenian tyrant Hippias
 Hipparchus of Euboea, an ancient Euboean tyrant
 Hipparchus (poet), an ancient Greek actor from Corinth
 Tiberius Claudius Hipparchus Marathonios, the richest man in the Roman Empire in the 1st century BC
 Hipparchus (dialogue), a dialogue ascribed to Plato